Burki Budhal is a village in the Tehsil Gujar Khan District Rawalpindi of Pakistan. It is located at 33° 16' 5N 73° 18' 5E with an altitude of 450 metres (1479 feet). The village gets its name from the Budhal tribe, who make up the majority of the population.

References

Union councils of Islamabad Capital Territory
Villages in Islamabad Capital Territory